syslog-ng is a free and open-source implementation of the syslog protocol for Unix and Unix-like systems. It extends the original syslogd model with content-based filtering, rich filtering capabilities, flexible configuration options and adds important features to syslog, like using TCP for transport. As of today, syslog-ng is developed by Balabit IT Security Ltd. It has three editions with a common codebase. The first is called syslog-ng Open Source Edition (OSE) with the license LGPL. The second is called Premium Edition (PE) and has additional plugins (modules) under a proprietary license. The third is called Storebox (SSB), which comes as an appliance with a Web-based UI as well as additional features including ultra-fast-text search, unified search, content-based alerting and a premier tier support.

In January 2018, syslog-ng, as part of Balabit, was acquired by One Identity, a global vendor of identity and access management solutions under the Quest Software umbrella. The syslog-ng team remains an independent business within the One Identity organization and continues to develop its open source and commercial solutions under the syslog-ng brand.

Protocol
syslog-ng uses the standard BSD syslog protocol, specified in RFC 3164. As the text of RFC 3164 is an informational description and not a standard, some incompatible extensions of it emerged. Since version 3.0 syslog-ng also supports the syslog protocol specified in RFC 5424. syslog-ng interoperates with a variety of devices, and the format of relayed messages can be customized.

Extensions to the original syslog-ng protocol include:
 ISO 8601 timestamps with millisecond granularity and time zone information
 The addition of the name of relays in additional host fields, to make it possible to track the path of a given message
 Reliable transport using TCP
 TLS encryption (Since 3.0.1 in OSE )

History
The syslog-ng project began in 1998, when Balázs Scheidler, the primary author of syslog-ng, ported the existing nsyslogd code to Linux. The 1.0.x branch of syslog-ng was still based on the nsyslogd sources and are available in the syslog-ng source archive.

Right after the release of syslog-ng 1.0.x, a reimplementation of the code base started to address some of the shortcomings of nsyslogd and to address the licensing concerns of Darren Reed, the original nsyslogd author. This reimplementation was named stable in the October 1999 with the release of version 1.2.0. This time around, syslog-ng depended on some code originally developed for lsh by Niels Möller.

Three major releases (1.2, 1.4 and 1.6) were using this code base, the last release of the 1.6.x branch in February 2007. In this period of about 8 years, syslog-ng became one of the popular alternative syslog implementations.

In a volunteer based effort, yet another rewrite was started back in 2001, dropping lsh code and using the more widely available GLib library. This rewrite of the codebase took its time, the first stable release of 2.0.0 happened in October 2006.

Development efforts were focused on improving the 2.0.x branch; support for 1.6.x was dropped at the end of 2007. Support for 2.x was dropped at the end of 2009, but it is still used in some Linux distributions. Balabit, the company behind syslog-ng, started a parallel, commercial fork of syslog-ng, called syslog-ng Premium Edition.  Portions of the commercial income are used to sponsor development of the free version.

Syslog-ng version 3.0 was released in the fourth quarter of 2008.

Starting with the 3.0 version developments efforts were parallel on the Premium and on the Open Source Editions. PE efforts were focused on quality, transport reliability, performance and encrypted log storage. The Open Source Edition efforts focused on improving the flexibility of the core infrastructure to allow more and more different, non-syslog message sources.

Both the OSE & PE forks produced two releases (3.1 and 3.2) in 2010.

Features
syslog-ng provides a number of features in addition to transporting syslog messages and storing them in plain text log files:
 The ability to format log messages using Unix shell-like variable expansion (can break cross-platform log format compatibility)
 The use of this shell-like variable expansion when naming files, covering multiple destination files with a single statement
 The ability to send log messages to local applications
 Support for message flow-control in network transport
 Logging directly into a database (since syslog-ng OSE 2.1)
 Rewrite portions of the syslog message with set and substitute primitives (since syslog-ng OSE 3.0)
 Classify incoming log messages and at the same time extract structured information from the unstructured syslog message (since syslog-ng OSE 3.0)
 Generic name–value support: each message is just a set of name–value pairs, which can be used to store extra information (since syslog-ng OSE 3.0)
 The ability to process structured message formats transmitted over syslog, like extract columns from CSV formatted lines (since syslog-ng OSE 3.0)
 The ability to correlate multiple incoming messages to form a more complex, correlated event (since syslog-ng OSE 3.2);

Distributions
syslog-ng is available on a number of different Linux and Unix distributions. Some install it as the system default, or provide it as a package that replaces the previous standard syslogd. Several Linux distributions that used syslog-ng have replaced it with rsyslog.

 openSUSE used it as default prior to openSUSE 11.2, and is still available
 SLES used it prior to SUSE Linux Enterprise Server 12
 Debian GNU/Linux used syslogd and klogd prior to 5.0; post-5.0 ("Lenny"), rsyslog is used
 Gentoo Linux
 Fedora used it prior to Fedora 10
 Arch Linux used it as default prior to the adoption of systemd in 2012
 Hewlett-Packard's HP-UX
 FreeBSD port
 A Cygwin port is available for Microsoft Windows

Portability
syslog-ng is highly portable to many Unix systems, old and new alike. A list of the currently known to work Unix versions are found below:
 Linux on i386, ARM, PowerPC, SPARC and x86-64 CPUs
 FreeBSD 7.x - 9.x on i386 and x86-64 CPUs
 AIX 5, 6 and 7 on IBM Power microprocessors
 HP-UX 11iv1, 11iv2 and 11iv3 on PA-RISC and Itanium CPUs
 Solaris 8, 9, 10 on SPARC, x86-64 and i386 CPUs
 Tru64 5.1b on Alpha CPUs

The list above is based on BalaBit's current first hand experience, other platforms may also work, but your mileage may vary.

Related RFCs & working groups
  - The BSD syslog protocol
  - The Syslog Protocol
  - Transport Layer Security (TLS) Transport Mapping for Syslog
  - Transmission of Syslog Messages over UDP

See also

 NXLog
 Datadog
 Syslog
 Rsyslog
 journald – incorporates syslog-functionality
 Graylog

References

External links
 
 Official syslog-ng documentation
 A comparison of syslog-ng web guis
 lggr.io - The web based syslog gui
 Michael D. Bauer: Linux Server Security, Second Edition published 2005 at O'Reilly: System Log Management and Monitoring (Chapter 12)
 syslog-ng FAQ
 Syslog-ng and vlogger meet

Free network-related software
Internet protocols
Internet Standards
Linux security software
Network management
System administration